

Honours
CSA Steaua București
Liga III: 2020–21
Liga IV: 2019–20

 Andrei Antohi (born 16 December 1988) is a Romanian footballer striker.

References

External links
 
 

Living people
1988 births
Romanian footballers
Liga I players
ASC Oțelul Galați players
FC Internațional Curtea de Argeș players
CS Pandurii Târgu Jiu players
CSU Voința Sibiu players
Liga II players
FCM Dunărea Galați players
CSM Jiul Petroșani players
LPS HD Clinceni players
CS Luceafărul Oradea players
CSA Steaua București footballers
Oman Professional League players
Sohar SC players
Romanian expatriate footballers
Expatriate footballers in Oman
Romanian expatriate sportspeople in Oman
Association football forwards
Sportspeople from Galați